The 2018 Darwin Tennis International was a professional tennis tournament played on outdoor hard courts. It was the fifth edition of the tournament and was part of the 2018 ITF Men's Circuit and the 2018 ITF Women's Circuit. It took place in Darwin, Australia, on 24–30 September 2018.

Women's singles main draw entrants

Seeds 

 1 Rankings as of 17 September 2018.

Other entrants 
The following players received a wildcard into the singles main draw:
  Alison Bai
  Naiktha Bains
  Kaylah McPhee
  Olivia Tjandramulia

The following players received entry from the qualifying draw:
  Maddison Inglis
  Kyōka Okamura
  Irina Ramialison
  Zuzana Zlochová

The following player received entry as a lucky loser:
  Marianna Zakarlyuk

Men's singles main draw entrants

Seeds 

 1 Rankings as of 17 September 2018.

Other entrants 
The following players received a wildcard into the singles main draw:
  Ken Cavrak
  Alexander Crnokrak
  Jesse Delaney
  Mustafa Ibraimi

The following player received entry into the singles main draw by a special exempt:
  Jayden Court

The following players received entry from the qualifying draw:
  David Barclay
  Corey Gaal
  Christian Langmo
  Winter Meagher
  Masayoshi Ono
  Vincent Stouff
  Jacob Sullivan
  Socrates Leon Tsoronis

Champions

Women's singles

 Kimberly Birrell def.  Ellen Perez, 6–3, 6–3

Men's singles
 Yuta Shimizu def.  Evan Hoyt, 7–6(8–6), 3–6, 6–4

Women's doubles

 Rutuja Bhosale /  Hiroko Kuwata def.  Kimberly Birrell /  Katy Dunne, 6–2, 6–4

Men's doubles
 Jeremy Beale /  Thomas Fancutt def.  Brydan Klein /  Scott Puodziunas, 7–6(7–4), 6–3

External links 
 2018 Darwin Tennis International at ITFtennis.com
 Official website

2018 ITF Women's Circuit
2018 ITF Men's Circuit
2018 in Australian tennis
Darwin Tennis International